Raouf Benabid (born August 3, 1985) is an Algerian former swimmer, who specialized in individual medley events. Benabid qualified for the men's 200 m individual medley at the 2004 Summer Olympics in Athens, by clearing a FINA B-standard entry time of 2:07.04 from the EDF Swimming Open in Paris. He edged out Andorra's Hocine Haciane to lead the second heat by 0.14 of a second in 2:06.34. Benabid failed to advance into the semifinals, as he placed thirty-fifth overall in the preliminaries.

References

1985 births
Living people
Algerian male swimmers
Olympic swimmers of Algeria
Swimmers at the 2004 Summer Olympics
Male medley swimmers
Mediterranean Games bronze medalists for Algeria
Mediterranean Games medalists in swimming
Swimmers at the 2001 Mediterranean Games
21st-century Algerian people